Bonarda may refer to one of several grape varieties:
 Douce noir, known as Bonarda in Argentina and Charbono in California 
 Bonarda Piemontese, grown in Piedmont, around Turin
 Croatina or Bonarda dell'Oltrepò Pavese, grown in Lombardy, around Pavia
 Uva Rara or Bonarda Novarese, in Novara and Vercelli.